Splash is an indian retail company based in Dubai and founded in Sharjah, It is part of the Landmark Group.
Founded in 1993 as a single-brand store in Sharjah, in the United Arab Emirates, Splash has grown to over 150 stores and 50 brand stores across 14 countries in India, the Middle East, Pakistan, Tanzania and Libya. Its sister groups are Lifestyle Stores and Home Centre Stores. Salman Khan is the Brand Ambassador of Splash Fashion India.

Stores
Splash was originally founded in Sharjah in the UAE in 1993 and is currently present in 16 countries and has more than 150 stores.
 United Arab Emirates: 33
 Bangladesh: 3
 Egypt: 6
 India: 19
 Iraq: 4
 Jordan: 1
 Kuwait: 13
 Lebanon: 2
 Libya: 1
 Oman: 5
 Pakistan: 3
 Qatar: 3
 Saudi Arabia: 78
 Sri Lanka: 1 
 Tanzania: 1
 Bahrain: 9

Awards and recognition
Splash has received several industry accolades that include being awarded “Super brand” status in 2013, four times in a row. Splash, listed in Forbes Arabia’s “Top 40 Arab Brands” list, has also been recognized by Dubai Customs for being the largest importer of ready made garments in the UAE. In 2011, Splash received an award for the Most Admired Marketing Campaign, at the Retail ME Awards 2011, along with the Most Admired Retailer award.

Events

Another first for the brand and in the region is the Splash Limited Edition Calendar which was launched in January 2011. Gifted to opinion-makers and VIPs from across the globe and currently in its third edition, the calendar is shot by prominent photographers such as Tejal Patni.

In past years Splash has partnered with Dubai Fashion week to serve as a launch platform for budding talent and has sponsored local musicians such as Amr Diab, co-sponsored a Metallica concert, presented stand-up comedian Nitin Mirani and hosted the Desert Rock festival, among other events.

References

External links 
 Splash Fashions

Clothing companies established in 1993
Retail companies established in 1993
Companies based in Dubai
Clothing retailers of the United Arab Emirates